The Yellow Sea is a marginal sea of the Western Pacific Ocean located between mainland China and the Korean Peninsula, and can be considered the northwestern part of the East China Sea.  It is one of four seas named after common colour terms (the others being the Black Sea, the Red Sea and the White Sea), and its name is descriptive of the golden-yellow color of the silt-ridden water discharged from major rivers.

The innermost bay of northwestern Yellow Sea is called the Bohai Sea (previously Gulf of Zhili / Beizhili), into which flow some of the most important rivers of northern China, such as the Yellow River (through Shandong province and its capital Jinan), the Hai River (through Beijing and Tianjin) and the Liao River (through Liaoning province).  The northeastern extension of the Yellow Sea is called the Korea Bay, into which flow the Yalu River, the Chongchon River and the Taedong River.

Since November 1, 2018, the Yellow Sea has also served as the location of "peace zones" between North and South Korea.

Geography

Extent
The International Hydrographic Organization defines the limits of the Yellow Sea ("Hwang Hai") as follows:
The Yellow Sea is separated from the Sea of Japan by the boundary from the southern end of Haenam Peninsula in Jeollanamdo to Jeju Island and divided into the East China Sea by the boundary from the west end of Jeju Island to the Yangtze River estuary.

Physiography

The sea is a flooded section of continental shelf that formed after the last ice age (some 10,000 years ago) as sea levels rose  to their current levels. The depth gradually increases from north to south. The sea bottom and shores are dominated by sand and silt brought by the rivers through the Bohai Sea (Liao River, Yellow River, Hai He) and the Korea Bay (Yalu River). These deposits, together with sand storms are responsible for the yellowish colour of the water referenced in the sea's name. The sea annually receives so much sand and silt from rivers such as the Yellow River, that it actually turns into a golden-yellow colour.

The seas surrounding Korea, which occupy a corner of Northeast Asia, border the “island nation” from the east, south, and west. Korea has named these the East Sea, South Sea, and West Sea (officially known as the Yellow Sea), respectively.

Major islands of the sea include Anmado, Baengnyeongdo, Daebudo, Deokjeokdo, Gageodo, Ganghwado, Hauido, Heuksando, Hongdo, Jejudo, Jindo, Muuido, Sido, Silmido, Sindo, Wando, Yeongjongdo and Yeonpyeongdo (all in South Korea).

Climate and hydrology

The area has cold, dry winters with strong northernly monsoons blowing from late November to March. Summers are wet and warm with frequent typhoons between June and October. Fog is frequent along the coasts, especially in the upwelling cold-water areas.

Southward currents prevail near the sea coast, especially in the winter monsoon period.

The water temperature is close to freezing in the northern part in winter, so drift ice patches and continuous ice fields form and hinder navigation between November and March. The water temperature and salinity are homogeneous across the depth. In spring and summer, the upper layer is warmed up by the sun and diluted by the fresh water from rivers, while the deeper water remains cold and saline. This deep water stagnates and slowly moves south. Commercial bottom-dwelling fishes are found around this mass of water, especially at its southern part. The average salinity is relatively low, at 30‰ in the north to 33–34‰ in the south, dropping to 26‰ or lower near the river deltas. In the southwest monsoon season (June to August) the increased rainfall and runoff further reduce the salinity of the upper sea layer.

Tides are semidiurnal, i.e. rise twice a day. The tidal system rotates in a counterclockwise direction. The fastest tides reaching  occur in the Myeongnyang Strait between the Jindo Island and the Korean Peninsula.

The event occurs about twice a year, at the beginning of May and in the middle of June. It had long been celebrated in a local festival called "Jindo Sea Parting Festival", but was largely unknown to the outside world until 1975, when the French ambassador Pierre Randi described the phenomenon in a French newspaper.

Flora and fauna

The sea is rich in seaweed (predominantly kelp, Laminaria japonica), cephalopods, crustaceans, shellfish, clams, and especially in blue-green algae which bloom in summer and contribute to the water color (see image above). For example, the seaweed production in the area was as high as 1.5 million tonnes in 1979 for China alone. The abundance of all these plant and animal species increases toward the south and indicates a high sea productivity, accounting for the diversity of fish species and high fish yield from the sea. Several species of goby new to science have been discovered recently in the Yellow Sea.

Those flats consist of highly productive sediments with a rich benthic fauna and are of great importance for migratory waders and shorebirds. Surveys show that the area is the single most important site for migratory birds on northward migration in the entire East Asian – Australasian Flyway, with more than 35 species occurring in internationally significant numbers. Two million birds, at minimum, pass through at the time, and about half that number use it on southward migration. About 300,000 migrating birds were transiting annually only through the Saemangeum tidal flat area. This estuary was however dammed by South Korea in 1991–2006 that resulted in drying off the land. Land reclamation also took 65% of the intertidal area in China between the 1950s and 2002, and as of 2005 there were plans to reclaim a further 45%.

Populations of oceanic megafauna, such as marine mammals, sea turtles, and larger fish, have decreased in modern times, not only due to pollution but also due to hunting. Japanese industrial whaling and illegal mass operations by the Soviet Union with support from Japan have been major drivers of population decline. Species that reside in the area today include spotted seals, and cetaceans such as minke whales, killer whales, false killer whales, and finless porpoises, but nonetheless all the remnants of species listed could be in very small numbers. Historically, large whales were very abundant either for summering and wintering in the Yellow and Bohai Seas. For example, a unique population of resident fin whales and gray whales were historically presented, or possibly hosted some North Pacific right whales and Humpback whales (3 whales including a cow calf pair was observed at Changhai County in 2015) year-round other than migrating individuals, and many other migratory species such as Baird's beaked whales.
Even blue whales, Japanese sea lions, dugongs (in southern regions only), and leatherback turtles used to breed or migrate into Yellow and Bohai seas.

Spotted seals are the only resident species of seal in the Yellow Sea. A sanctuary for these seals is situated at Baengnyeongdo, which is also known for its finless porpoises. Great white sharks have also been known to prey on seals in the area.

Economy

The sea waters had been used for fishing by the Chinese, Korean and Japanese ships for centuries. Especially rich in fish are the bottom layers. About 200 fish species are exploited commercially, especially sea bream, croakers, lizard fishes, prawns, cutlassfish, horse mackerel, squid, eel, filefish, Pacific herring, chub mackerel, flounder and jellyfish. The intensity of fishing has been gradually increasing for China and Korea and decreasing for Japan. For example, the production volumes for China rose from 619,000 tonnes in 1985 to 1,984,400 tonnes in 1996. All species are overfished, however, and while the total catchments are rising, the fish population is continuously declining for most species.

Navigation is another traditional activity in the Yellow Sea. The main Chinese ports are Dalian, Tianjin, Qingdao and Qinhuangdao. The major South Korean ports on the Yellow Sea are Incheon, Gunsan and Mokpo, and that for North Korea is Nampho, the outport of Pyongyang. The Bohai Train Ferry provides a shortcut between the Liaodong Peninsula and Shandong. A major naval accident occurred on 24 November 1999 at Yantai, Shandong, China when the 9,000-ton Chinese ferry Dashun caught fire and capsized in rough seas. About 300 people were killed, making it the worst maritime incident in China.

Oil exploration has been successful in the Chinese and North Korean portions of the sea, with the proven and estimated reserves of about 9 and 20 billion tonnes, respectively. However, the study and exploration of the sea is somewhat hindered by insufficient sharing of information between the involved countries. China initiated collaborations with foreign oil companies in 1979, but this initiative declined later.

The port had been closed and fishing suspended until the end of August. Eight hundred fishing boats and 40 specialized vessels were mobilized to relieve the environmental damage.

State of the environment
The Yellow Sea is considered among the most degraded marine areas on earth. Loss of natural coastal habitats due to land reclamation has resulted in the destruction of more than 60% of tidal wetlands around the Yellow Sea coastline in approximately 50 years. Rapid coastal development for agriculture, aquaculture and industrial development are considered the primary drivers of coastal destruction in the region. This degree of loss of area, widespread pollution, algal blooms and declines of invertebrate and vertebrate fauna have resulted in the classification of this ecosystem as endangered.

In addition to land reclamation, the Yellow Sea ecosystem is facing several other serious environmental problems. Pollution is widespread and deterioration of pelagic and benthic habitat quality has occurred, and harmful algal blooms frequently occur. Invasion of introduced species are having a detrimental effect on the Yellow Sea environment. There are 25 intentionally introduced species and 9 unintentionally introduced species in the Yellow Sea Large Marine Ecosystem. Declines of biodiversity, fisheries and ecosystem services in the Yellow Sea are widespread.

The tidal flats of the Yellow Sea are considered endangered.

Location of Korean Peace Zones
On 1 November 2018, officials from South Korea's Ministry of National Defense confirmed that "peace zones" had been established by the North and South Korean militaries in the Yellow Sea area that touches the North and South Korean demarcation line. A buffer zone was also created in the Yellow Sea's Northern Limit Line (NLL).

See also

 Battle of Chemulpo Bay
 Battle of the Yellow Sea
 Geography of China
 Geography of North Korea
 Geography of South Korea
 Ganghwa Island incident
 Korea strait

References

Bibliography
 Chikuni, S. (1985). The Fish Resources of the Northwest Pacific, Food and Agriculture Organization, 

 
China Seas
China–North Korea border
Geography of East Asia
Geography of Korea
Geography of Northeast Asia
Marine ecoregions
Marginal seas of the Pacific Ocean
North Korea–South Korea border
Seas of China
Seas of North Korea
Seas of South Korea
Temperate Northern Pacific